Chariesthes laetula is a species of beetle in the family Cerambycidae. It was described by Péringuey in 1899, originally under the genus Tragiscoschema. It is known from Tanzania, Mozambique and Zimbabwe.

References

Chariesthes
Beetles described in 1899